Raahu is a 2020 Indian Telugu-language thriller film written and directed by debutant Subbu Vedula. The film features Kriti Garg and AbeRaam Varma in the lead roles while Vedula, Satyam Rajesh, Prabhakar, and Raja Ravindra play supporting roles with music composed by Praveen Lakkaraju. The plot revolves around Bhanu (Garg) who suffers conversion disorder, which makes her temporarily blind upon the sight of blood.

Plot

Cast 
Kriti Garg as Bhanu
AbeRaam Varma as Sesh
Prabhakar as Nagaraju 
Subbu Vedula as the police commissioner
Satyam Rajesh
Raja Ravindra
Sahasra as child bhanu

Production 
After returning from the US, Vedula worked on the project for over two-and-a-half years. Vedula cast AbeRaam Varma in the lead role after seeing his performance in Manu (2018).

Raahu was majorly filmed in Hyderabad, while some sequences are shot in Sikkim.

Soundtrack 

The album's single "Emo Emo Emo" with the vocals of Sid Sriram was received positively by the audience.

Release and reception 
Raahu was released on 28 February 2020.

Sangeetha Devi writing for The Hindu, termed the film as an "indie-spirited venture" and an "appreciable first attempt". Prakash Pecheti of Telangana Today wrote that "Raahu is a honest attempt from newbie Subbu Vedula to tell a story of a different subject which was never touched by Telugu directors."

The Times of India rated the film 2 out of 5 stars. While appreciating the execution and production values, the review stated "Director Subbu should've worked a little more on the way he narrated the story because he squandered away a good opportunity. Raahu is sincere and hard work that unfortunately goes in vain!"

Santosh Yamsani from Sakshi wrote that though the director's attempt at a novel concept is appreciable, he was unable turn it into a strong screenplay.

References

External links 

2020 directorial debut films
Films about blind people in India
Films shot in Hyderabad, India
Films shot in Sikkim
2020s Telugu-language films
2020 films
Indian thriller drama films
Indian romantic thriller films
2020 thriller drama films